Éric Pras (born 1 March 1972) is a French chef, Meilleur Ouvrier de France (2004), rated three stars by the Guide Michelin. He is the owner of the restaurant Lameloise located in Chagny, Saône-et-Loire.

Training and career 
Pras trained at the Hôtel Central de Renaison and then at the Maison Troisgros in Roanne, with Bernard Loiseau in Saulieu, with Pierre Gagnaire in Saint-Étienne, with Antoine Westermann in Strasbourg, at the Belle Otéro in Cannes, and with Régis Marcon in Saint-Bonnet-le-Froid.

He left Saint-Bonnet-le-Froid in 2008, where he had worked since 2005 as a sous-chef and chef, to go to Chagny where he replaced Jacques Lameloise as head chef of the Maison Lameloise restaurant.

Books 
 Toc toque, Éveil et découvertes, 18 pages, 2008, 
 With Frédéric Lamy (author), Philippe Rossat (author) and Matthieu Cellard (photographer), Lameloise : Une maison en Bourgogne, Glénat, 216 pages, 2011,

See also 

List of Michelin starred restaurants

References 

1972 births
French chefs
People from Roanne
Head chefs of Michelin starred restaurants
Living people